Sele is a settlement in the City Municipality of Slovenj Gradec in northern Slovenia. The area is part of the traditional region of Styria. The entire municipality is now included in the Carinthia Statistical Region.

The parish church in the settlement is dedicated to Saint Roch and belongs to the Roman Catholic Archdiocese of Maribor. It dates to the late 15th century.  A second church in the east of the settlement dedicated to Saint Nicholas and was built in the early 14th century.

References

External links
Sele at Geopedia

Populated places in the City Municipality of Slovenj Gradec
Slovenj Gradec